Fort Beaufort (Xhosa: iBhofolo), officially renamed KwaMaqoma in March 2023, is a town in the Amatole District of South Africa's Eastern Cape Province, and had a population of 25,668 in 2011. The town was established in 1837 and became a municipality in 1883. The town lies at the confluence of the Kat River and Brak River between the Keiskamma and Great Fish Rivers. KwaMaqoma serves as a mini-'dormitory' for academic staff and students of Fort Hare University, based in the nearby town of Alice, and is also close to Sulphur Springs.

It is also the birthplace of South African politician and anti-apartheid activist who is also the first Premier of the Eastern Cape Raymond Mhlaba and his former first wife Joyce Meke.

History
The roots of Fort Beaufort is a mission station that the Reverend Joseph Williams of the London Missionary Society established in 1816. In 1822, Colonel Maurice Scott of the Royal Warwickshire Regiment constructed a blockhouse about three miles from the mission station as a military frontier post and stronghold against raids by the Xhosa under their chief, Maqoma.  The British named it Fort Beaufort to honour the Duke of Beaufort, father of Lord Charles Henry Somerset, first British governor of the Cape Colony (1814 to 1826). After the 6th Xhosa War (1834–1835), Governor Sir Benjamin d'Urban authorised construction of a fort at the site of the original blockhouse. The new buildings included a military hospital, guard houses, infantry barracks, and officers' quarters.

In 1839, the British commenced work on what is probably the world's only inland Martello tower, a small, circular Napoleonic era design hitherto used only in coastal defences.  The tower was completed in 1846. Today, the original howitzer remains mounted on the roof on a traversing carriage that gives it a 360-degree field of fire.  The tower has been restored after having served for some time as a public latrine.

In 1840 KwaMaqoma became a town. Around this time Andrew Geddes Bain built the first road, including the Ecca Pass, from Grahamstown, to Fort Beaufort.

During the 8th Xhosa War (1850–53), also known as the War of Mlanjeni, anti-British forces unsuccessfully attacked the town. Harmanus Matroos, alias Ngxukumeshe, was a half-Khoikhoi and half-Xhosa. He started the war on 30 December 1850 by capturing a small outpost near Fort Beaufort. Matroos had served the British in the 7th Xhosa War (1846–47), also known as the War of the Axe. Matroos fell on 8 January 1851 during his third attack on Fort Beaufort.

British troops occupied the town until 1870.

In 1949 the first congregation of the Nederduitse Gereformeerde Kerk (Dutch Reformed Church) seceded from Alice due to demographic changes.

Schools
Schools in the area include the historic Healdtown Comprehensive School. Fort Beaufort has number of high schools that include:

Eyabantu High, Inyibiba High, Lindani High, Winterberg High, Thubalethu High, Sakhululeka High, and the newly built Lighthouse Academy.

Culture

Healthcare today
Fort Beaufort has three governmental hospitals, namely Fort Beaufort Provincial Hospital, Tower Psychiatric Hospital, and Winterberg TB (previous SANTA) Hospital. There are also seven primary healthcare clinics in the area, namely C.C. Lloyd (in the CBD), Newtown, Hillside, Thozamile, Lulama Kama, Healdtown and Mxelo.

Notable people

Raymond Mhlaba (first Premier of the Eastern Cape)
Josiah Gumede (President of the ANC 1927-1930)
Charlotte Maxeke (First President of the ANCWL)
Ian Roberts (Actor) 
Ken Gampu (Actor)
Ian Roberts (Actor/Director)
Donald Gray (Actor)
Tony Yengeni (Politician)
Oliver Zono (Rugby Player)
Ali Mgijima (Rugby Player )(Went to school in the area)
John Dugard (Professor of International Law)
Ollie le Roux (Rugby Player)

See also

 List of Castles and Fortifications in South Africa

References

Populated places in the Raymond Mhlaba Local Municipality
Beaufort
Populated places established in 1822
1822 establishments in the British Empire